This list of tallest buildings in Kochi ranks high-rises in Kochi, India based on height. As of 2013, 
Choice Paradise is the tallest building in Kochi, with a total height of 137 metres (450 ft).

Tallest buildings
This lists ranks buildings in Kochi that stand at least  from the ground. This includes spires and architectural details but does not include antenna masts. The Only completed buildings and under-construction buildings that have been topped out are included.

Tallest under construction 

This lists ranks buildings that are under construction in Kochi and are planned to rise at least  or 25 floors tall. Buildings that are approved, on hold or proposed are included in this table.

See also 
 List of tallest buildings in Kerala
City Waters Aluva 
 List of tallest buildings in India

References 

Buildings and structures in Kochi
Kochi
tallest buildings in Kochi
Kochi-related lists